Padmakar Union is a union parishad of Jhenaidah Sadar Upazila, in Jhenaidah District, Khulna Division of Bangladesh. There are 17 villages and 7 mouzas in the union.

References

External links
 

Unions of Khulna Division
Unions of Jhenaidah Sadar Upazila
Unions of Jhenaidah District